Talilit (Tarifit: Taririt, ⵜⴰⵍⵉⵍⵉⵜ; Arabic: تليليت) is a commune in Driouch Province of the Oriental administrative region of Morocco. At the time of the 2004 census, the commune had a total population of 6161 people living in 1115 households.

Etymology
The name Talilit most likely came from the Berber word 'Alili' (from Ilili), in Riffian-Berber referred to as Ariri, which is the word for the Nerium Oleander plant.

References

Populated places in Driouch Province
Rural communes of Oriental (Morocco)